The name Bese can refer to the following:
 Bese family, an ancient Swedish noble family
 Bese (Bhatkal district) village in Bhatkal district, Karnataka State, India
 Hungarian name of Stejărenii, a constituent village  of Daneș commune in Romania
Barnabás Bese (born 1994), Hungarian football player
Gunilla Bese (1475–1553), Finnish noble, fiefholder of Vyborg Castle 1511-1513
Valeria Bese or Valeria Motogna-Beșe (born 1979), Romanian handball player

See also
Besse (disambiguation)
Bessie (disambiguation)
Betsey (disambiguation)